Lawrence Yu Kam-kee MBE, BBS, JP (born 1946) is a prominent Hong Kong businessman.

Biography 
He graduated from the Diocesan Boys' School in the 1960s.

He is currently serving as the Chairman of the China Renji Medical Group Limited.

He is the former Chairman of the Hong Kong Community Chest Fund and the Hong Kong Football Association.

In 2021, he contracted COVID and spent 15 days in hospital.

Filmography
 Night Caller (1985)

Honours
 MBE.
 Bronze Bauhinia Star of the HKSAR.
 Justice of Peace of the HKSAR.

References

1946 births
Living people
Hong Kong businesspeople